Papilio caiguanabus, the Poey's black swallowtail, is a species of Neotropical butterfly in the family Papilionidae. It is endemic to Cuba.

Description
P. caiguanabus has a peculiar appearance owing to the absence of the yellow discal bands and the enlargement of the submarginal spots.

References

 Calhoun, J. 2018. Papilio (Heraclides) caiguanabus Poey (Papilionidae): a new U.S. record from the Florida Keys, with notes on its name and food plant News of the Lepidopterists' Society 60:84-87   

Lewis, H. L., 1974 Butterflies of the World  Page 24, figure 16 (female).

External links
Butterflycorner Images from Naturhistorisches Museum Wien

caiguanabus
Butterflies of Cuba
Endemic fauna of Cuba
Butterflies described in 1851
Taxonomy articles created by Polbot